Lena Rivers is a 1914 silent feature film produced by Whitman Features Company and starring Violet Horner. It is an early production based on the novel by Mary J. Holmes. It was the second of two features released in 1914 with this title.

It is preserved in the Library of Congress collection.

Cast
Violet Horner - Lena Rivers
Harrish Ingraham - Durwood Belmont
 Mary Moore - Carrie Livingston
Martin J. Faust - Harry Rivers Graham
Mrs. Middleton - Lady Belmont
Harry H. Forman - Mr. Livingston
Mrs. Ford - Grandma Nichols

References

External links
 Lena Rivers at IMDb.com

1914 films
American silent feature films
Films based on American novels
American black-and-white films
1914 drama films
1910s American films